Raymond Reginald "Mick" Cossey (21 January 1935 – 24 May 1986) was a New Zealand rugby union player. He played just one match for the New Zealand national side, the All Blacks: the first test against the touring Australian side in 1958.

A schoolteacher, Cossey taught at Patutahi School, near Gisborne, in the mid-1950s, where one of his students was future All Black Ian Kirkpatrick. Cossey was killed in an accident at a railway crossing in 1986, and his ashes were buried in Papakura Cemetery.

References

1935 births
1986 deaths
People from Papakura
People educated at Otahuhu College
New Zealand rugby union players
New Zealand international rugby union players
Auckland rugby union players
Poverty Bay rugby union players
Counties Manukau rugby union players
Rugby union centres
Rugby union wings
New Zealand schoolteachers
Railway accident deaths in New Zealand
Burials at Papakura Cemetery
Rugby union players from Auckland